Don Pepín García is a brand of handmade premium cigar owned by El Rey de los Habanos, Inc.

History
The Don Pepin Garcia brand was created by José "Pepín" García and is manufactured at the El Rey de los Habanos factory in the Little Havana section of Miami, Florida, and at the factory in Estelí, Nicaragua, Tabacalera Cubana.

Description 
The Don Pepin Garcia brand currently consists of three labels of different strengths and flavors. All use Nicaraguan tobaccos in varying combinations. All boxes are stamped with a date code.

Don Pepin Garcia (Blue Label) 

This was the first of the three ranges (the second was the Series JJ) to be produced, and consists of six Vitolas and one limited release (the Lancero) produced for Puff 'N' Stuff Cigars Decatur, Ga. These are full-bodied cigars and are not recommended for a beginning smoker. The wrapper is an oily Nicaraguan Corojo Oscuro leaf, described as cinnamon in color. The cigars come packed 25 to a cedar box, uncelloed (as of recently, Summer of '07 Celloed). The band is blue with gold lettering. The center has "Don Pepin Garcia" in gold on a blue field inside a round red and gold border, with Don Pepín's signature (reduced) below the name. Each wing has the U. S. and Cuban flags within roundels, overlapping.

Ratings, honors and awards
The Invictos was given a rating of 88 in the August, 2006, issue of Cigar Aficionado magazine.
The Magnate received a rating of 89 in the February, 2007, issue of Cigar Aficionado magazine.

Don Pepín García Black Edition (Cuban Classic/Black Label) 

This was introduced to national distribution in the U.S. in late 2006. It is manufactured at Tabacalera Cubana in Estelí, Nicaragua. The cigars are surrounded by a colored ribbon with a label attached which reads Don Pepín García and bears a facsimile of his signature. The wrapper is Habano Rosado and the binder and filler is Nicaraguan. The cigar is described as medium- to full-bodied.

The sides of the box are stamped with "20 / Don Pepín (in script) / ♦ BLACK EDITION ♦ / frontmark".  As always, the month and year of manufacture are stamped on the bottom of the box.

Ratings, honors and awards
 The entire range was given a vertical tasting report in the 22 May 2007 (p. 2) of Cigar Insider. The 1979 was given the highest rating at 92. The lowest rating of 85 went to the 1973. The 1952 was given a rating of 88, and the 1950, 1970 and 1977 each received an 89.

Don Pepín García Series JJ (White Label) 

The range was developed by Don Pepín and his son Jaime García. Medium- to full-bodied, the wrapper is a Nicaraguan Corojo Oscuro, and the binder/filler is Nicaraguan. Packed in plain boxes of 24 except for the Salomon, which comes in boxes of five. The band is similar to the "Blue Label", but is white with a red border. There is also a second, straight band, white, with "Serie JJ" printed on it.

The Salomons are rolled exclusively by Don Pepín himself.

Series JJ Maduro 
A more rare variation of the Series JJ was the Series JJ Maduro. It was also the only Maduro cigar made by Pepin Garcia. It was discontinued in 2011.

More Cigars by Jose "Don" Pepin Garcia 

Jose "Don" Pepin Garcia, along with his son, Jaime Garcia, has created other labels after the huge success of the Don Pepin Garcia lines, from both their Estelí, Nicaragua (Tabacalera Cubana) and Miami, Florida, USA (El Rey de los Habanos) factories under the My Father Cigars company.

Other My Father Cigars labels include 
 Vegas Cubanas (recently available again)
 El Centurion
 Legado de Pepin
 La Duena
 La Reloba Habano
 My Father
 My Father Connecticut
 My Father Le Bijou 1922
 Flor de Las Antillas
 La Antiguedad
 Jaime Garcia Reserva Especial
 Siboney Reserve

See also
Pepin Garcia

References

External links
 Who is don Pepin?

Cigar brands